The Baalbeck International Festival is a cultural event in Lebanon. Since 1955, people from around the world have gone to the city of Baalbek in the Beqaa Valley of Lebanon to attend the annual festival. Classical music, dance, theater, opera, and jazz as well as modern world music are performed each July and August in the ancient Roman Acropolis.
The presidents of the festival have been as follows: 
Aimée Kettaneh from 1956 to 1969,
Salwa Said from 1970 to 1974,
May Arida from 1975 to 2010 and
Nayla de Freige from 2011 to present.

History
The festivals date back to the mid 20th century with the first organizing activities being held in 1955. After one year, President Chamoun named it the Baalbeck International Festival, which became a governmental institution whose goal was to promote tourism and Lebanese culture. The festival was held in July and August in the ruins of the Roman temples. In 1966, it established a drama school for the promotion of works done by Lebanese authors. 

After the Lebanese Civil War (1975–1990) and the cessation of festival activities for a quarter century, the festival reopened for incoming spectators in 1997. Cultural events such as classical music, opera, jazz, modern world music, Lebanese Nights, rock and pop music as well as ballet and theater regained their past location with over 40,000 yearly spectators watching in the unique historic setting of Baalbek.

On the 5th of July 2020, Baalbeck International Festival presented the first cultural event and premiere in the middle east after the COVID-19 confinement, under the title of "The Sound of Resilience". This non-profit concert was performed by the Lebanese Philharmonic Orchestra with the Choirs of the Antonine University, Notre Dame University and Qolo Atiqo, as well as young Lebanese musicians, under the baton of Maestro Fazlian and with the participation of Rafic Ali Ahmad. The premiere featured a visual show which included archive photos and visual creations is by Jean Louis Mainguy. The creation and production of the 3D mapping was done by the digital agency Cre8mania.

Festival highlights

Ballet
Ballet Rambert (1959)
The Royal Ballet (1961 Margot Fontaine)(1964 Fontaine with Rudolph Nureyev)
Australian Ballet (1965)
Bolshoi Ballet (1971)
Stuttgart Ballet
Béjart Ballet Lausanne (Maurice Béjart)

Dance
Caracalla Dance Theatre
Paul Taylor Dance Company (1970)
The Dance Theater of Alwin Nikolais
The Alvin Ailey Dance Theater
Lord of the Dance

Jazz
Ella Fitzgerald (1971)
Miles Davis (1973)
Charles Mingus (1974)
Herbie Hancock Quartet (1998)
Buena Vista Social Club (2000)
Gilbert Gil (2002)
Ahmed Jamal (2003)

Orchestra
The New York Philharmonic Orchestra (1959)
Chamber Orchestra of Stuttgart (1960)
The Pittsburgh Symphony Orchestra (1964)
Chamber Orchestra of Moscow (1965)
English Chamber Orchestra (1966)
Lebanese National Symphony Orchestra (2002) (2019 with Marcel Khalife)
Santa Cecilia Academy Rome Orchestra

Singers, musicians, actors
Fairuz (1957-73)
Umm Kulthoum (1966)
Joan Baez (1974)
Nina Simone (1998)
Charles Aznavour (1999)
Marcel Khalife (2000)(2015)
Sting (2001)
Johnny Hallyday (2003)
Plácido Domingo (2004)
Warda Al-Jazairia (2005)
 Jessye Norman (2012)
 Gerard Depardieu (2014)
 Jean Michel Jarre (2016)
 Mika (2016)
 Ibrahim Maalouf (2017)
 Ben Harper (2018)
 Fanny Ardant
 Angela Gheorghiu
Sabah
 Angelique Kidjo
 Matthieu Chedid

Bands
Massive Attack (2004)
Deep Purple (2009)
Mashrou' Leila
Toto

Theatre
Fairuz, the Rahbani Brothers and the Lebanese popular troupe (from 1957 until 1973)
Comédie-Française (1961)
Théâtre National de Belgique

References

External links
Baalbeck International Festival Website

Music festivals in Lebanon
1955 establishments in Lebanon
Annual events in Lebanon
Music festivals established in 1955